Pernik Peninsula is the ice-covered peninsula projecting 40 km in northwest direction from Loubet Coast on the west side of Antarctic Peninsula.  It is bounded by Darbel Bay to the northeast, Lallemand Fjord to the west and Crystal Sound to the northwest, and its northern part is dominated by Protector Heights.

The peninsula is named after the city of Pernik in Western Bulgaria.

Location
British mapping in 1976.

Maps
 British Antarctic Territory.  Scale 1:200000 topographic map. DOS 610 Series, Sheet W 66 66.  Directorate of Overseas Surveys, Tolworth, UK, 1976.
Antarctic Digital Database (ADD). Scale 1:250000 topographic map of Antarctica. Scientific Committee on Antarctic Research (SCAR). Since 1993, regularly upgraded and updated.

References
 Bulgarian Antarctic Gazetteer. Antarctic Place-names Commission. (details in Bulgarian, basic data in English)
 Pernik Peninsula. SCAR Composite Gazetteer of Antarctica.

External links
 Pernik Peninsula. Copernix satellite image

Peninsulas of Graham Land
Bulgaria and the Antarctic
Loubet Coast
Pernik